Roncero may refer to:
Braulio Roncero (1951–2018), Spanish-born Dutch professional darts player
Fabián Roncero (born 1970), Spanish athlete
Paco Roncero (born 1969), Spanish chef
Ricardo Ronceros (born 1977), Peruvian footballer
Rodrigo Roncero (born 1977), Argentine rugby player